Thymiatris is a genus of moths of the family Xyloryctidae.

Species
 Thymiatris allocrossa (Turner, 1902)
 Thymiatris arista Diakonoff, [1968]
 Thymiatris cephalochra (Lower, 1894)
 Thymiatris melitacma Meyrick, 1907
 Thymiatris microloga Diakonoff, 1966
 Thymiatris scolia Diakonoff, 1966
 Thymiatris seriosa Diakonoff, 1966

References

 
Xyloryctidae
Xyloryctidae genera